Ibrahim II may refer to:

Ibrahim II of Ifriqiya (850–902), ninth Aghlabid emir of Ifriqiya
İbrahim II of Karaman (died 1464), bey of Karaman
Ibrahim II Sheykhshah ( 1502–1524), Shah of Shirvan
Ibrahim Khan II ( 1689–1697), Subahdar of Bengal

See also
Ibrahim I (disambiguation)
Abraham II (disambiguation)